Romanian literature is literature written by Romanian authors, although the term may also be used to refer to all literature written in the Romanian language or by any authors native to Romania.

History
The development of the Romanian literature took place in parallel with that of a rich Romanian folklore - lyric, epic, dramatic and didactic - which continued in modern times. The Romanian oral literature includes doine (lyric songs), balade (ballads), hore (dance songs), colinde (carols), basme (fairy tales), snoave (anecdotes), vorbe (proverbs), and ghicitori (riddles).

Beginnings

The earliest surviving document in Romanian is Neacșu's Letter written in 1521, to the jude ("judge and mayor") of Brașov, Hans Benkner.

Romanian culture was heavily influenced by the Eastern Orthodox Church, the official stance of the Romanian Church being that Orthodoxy was brought to the Romanian land by the Apostle Andrew. According to some modern Romanian scholars, the idea of early Christianisation is unsustainable, being used for propaganda purposes in the totalitarian era as part of the ideology of protochronism, which purports that the Orthodox Church has been a companion and defender of the Romanian people for its entire history. The earliest translated books into Romanian were Slavonic religious texts from the 15th century. The Psalter of Șchei (Psaltirea Șcheiană) of 1482 and the Voroneț Codex (Codicele Voronețean) are religious texts that were written in Maramureș.

 
The first book printed in Romania was a Slavonic religious book in 1508. The first book printed in the Romanian language was a Protestant catechism of Deacon Coresi in 1559, printed by Filip Moldoveanul. Other translations from Greek and Slavonic books were printed later in the 16th century. Dosoftei, a Moldavian published in Poland in 1673, was the first Romanian metrical psalter, producing the earliest known poetry written in Romanian.

Early efforts to publish the Bible in Romanian started with the 1582 printing in the small town of Orăștie of the so-called Palia de la Orăștie – a translation of the first books of the Old Testament - by Deacon Șerban (a son of the above-mentioned Deacon Coresi) and Marien Diacul (Marien the Scribe). Palia was translated from Latin by Bishop Mihail Tordaș et al., the translation being checked for accuracy using Hungarian translations of the Bible.

The entire Bible was not published in Romanian until the end of the 17th century, when monks at the monastery of Snagov, near Bucharest, translated and printed "Biblia de la București – "The Bucharest Bible" in 1688.

In Transylvania, there was also an attestation of the explicit use of a Latin model, with the appearance of the first Romanian dictionary, Dictionarium Valachico-Latinum (Caransebeș, about 1650), while the first grammar of the Romanian language written in Latin was Institutiones linguae Valachicae (Crișana, circa 1770).

European humanism came to Moldavia in the 17th century via Poland with its representative, Miron Costin, writing a chronicle on the history of Moldavia. Another humanist was Dimitrie Cantemir, who wrote histories of Wallachia and Moldavia.

Ottoman Decadence and Phanariotes

The 18th century in the Romanian lands was dominated by the Ottoman Empire, which decided not to allow Romanian rulers in Wallachia and Moldavia and ruled, instead, through Greek merchants of Istanbul, called phanariotes.

Thus, Greek culture influenced the developments of Romanian literature. For example, one of the greatest poets of this century was Alecu Văcărescu, who wrote love songs in the tradition of the ancient Greek poet Anacreon. His father, Ienăchiță, was a poet as well, though he also wrote the first Romanian grammar, while his son, Iancu, was probably one of the greatest poets of his generation. A human comedy was developed in the anecdotes of Anton Pann, who tried to illustrate a bit of the Balkanic spirit and folklore which was brought by the Ottomans in the Romanian lands.

However, the next generation of Romanian writers headed toward European Illuminism for inspiration, among them Gheorghe Asachi, Ion Budai-Deleanu, and Dinicu Golescu.

National awakening

As the revolutionary ideas of nationalism spread in Europe, they were also used by the Romanians, who desired their own national state, but were living under foreign rule. Many Romanian writers of the time were also part of the national movement and participated in the revolutions of 1821 and 1848. The Origin of the Romanians began to be discussed and in Transylvania, a Latinist movement, Școala Ardeleană, emerged, producing philological studies about the Romanic origin of Romanian and opening Romanian language schools.

Romanians studied in France, Italy, and Germany, and German philosophy and French culture were integrated into modern Romanian literature, lessening the influence of Ancient Greece and the Orient over time. In Wallachia an important figure of the time was Ion Heliade Rădulescu, who founded the first Romanian-language journal and the Philharmonic Society, which later created the National Theatre of Bucharest.

The most important writers of the second half of the century were Vasile Alecsandri and later Mihai Eminescu. Alecsandri was a prolific writer, contributing to Romanian literature with poetry, prose, several plays, and collections of Romanian folklore. Eminescu is considered by most critics to be the most important and influential Romanian poet. His lyric poetry had many of its roots in Romanian traditions, but was also influenced by German philosophy and Hindu traditions.

Titu Maiorescu's Junimea literary circle, founded in 1863 and frequented by many Romanian writers, played an important role in Romanian literature. Many outstanding Romanian writers, including Ion Luca Caragiale, who wrote some of the best Romanian comedies, Ion Creangă, who wrote traditional Romanian stories and Barbu Ştefănescu Delavrancea, published their works during this time. George Coșbuc was a poet, translator, teacher, and journalist, best known for his verses describing, praising and eulogizing rural life. Nicolae Bălcescu, Dimitrie Bolintineanu, Alecu Russo, Nicolae Filimon, Bogdan Petriceicu Hasdeu, Alexandru Odobescu, Grigore Alexandrescu, Constantin Negruzzi, Alexandru Vlahuță, Alexandru Macedonski, Petre Ispirescu, Duiliu Zamfirescu, and Ioan Slavici are also important literary personalities of the era.

Interbellum literature

After achieving national unity in 1918, Romanian literature entered what can be called a golden age, characterized by the development of the Romanian novel. Traditional society and recent political events influenced works such as Liviu Rebreanu's Răscoala ("The Uprising"), which, published in 1932, was inspired by the 1907 Romanian Peasants' Revolt, and Pădurea Spânzuraților ("Forest of the Hanged"), published in 1922 and inspired by Romanian participation in World War I. The dawn of the modern novel can be seen in Hortensia Papadat-Bengescu (Concert din muzică de Bach—"Bach Concert"), Camil Petrescu (Ultima noapte de dragoste, întâia noapte de război—"The Last Night of Love, the First Night of War"). George Călinescu is another complex personality of Romanian literature: novelist, playwright, poet, literary critic and historian, essayist, journalist. He published authoritative monographs about Eminescu and Creangă, and a monumental (almost 1,000 pages in quarto) history of Romanian literature from its origin to the time of his writing (1941).

An important realist writer was Mihail Sadoveanu, who wrote mainly novels which took place at various times in the history of Moldova. But probably the most important writers were Tudor Arghezi, Lucian Blaga, and Mircea Eliade. Arghezi revolutionized Romanian poetry 50 years after Eminescu, creating new pillars for the modern Romanian poem. Blaga, one of the country's most important artistic personalities, developed through his writings a complex philosophic system, still not perfectly understood even today. Eliade is today considered the greatest historian in the field of religions. His novels reveal a mystical, pre-Christian symbolism paving the way for contemporary Romanian art.

Born in Romania, Tristan Tzara, a poet and essayist, is the main founder of Dada, a nihilistic revolutionary movement in the arts, and may have been responsible for its name (Romanian for "Yes yes"). Later he abandoned nihilism for Surrealism and Marxism. For the first time in its history, Romanian culture was fully connected to Western culture, while Dadaism is the first Romanian artistic and literary movement to become international. Dadaism and Surrealism are fundamental parts of the avant-garde, the most revolutionary form of modernism. The Romanian avant garde is very well represented by Ion Minulescu, Gherasim Luca, Urmuz, Perpessicius, Tristan Tzara, Grigore Cugler, Geo Bogza, Barbu Fundoianu, Gellu Naum, Ilarie Voronca, and Ion Vinea. Max Blecher was a poet whose life was cut short by health problems.

George Bacovia was a symbolist poet. While he initially belonged to the local Symbolist movement, his poetry came to be seen as a precursor of Romanian Modernism. Some important literary figures of this period were also active in other domains. Vasile Voiculescu was a Romanian poet, short-story writer, playwright, and physician. Ion Barbu was a poet, as well as an important mathematician.

Cezar Petrescu was a journalist, novelist, and children's writer. He is especially remembered for his children's book Fram, ursul polar ("Fram, the polar bear"; the circus animal character was named after Fram, the ship used by Fridtjof Nansen on his expeditions). Elena Farago was also a children's writer and poet.

Ion Agârbiceanu was a writer, as well as a politician, theologian and Greek-Catholic priest. Gala Galaction was another writer, who was also an Eastern Orthodox clergyman and theologian.

Other literary figures of this era include Ionel Teodoreanu, Panait Istrati, Gib Mihăescu, Otilia Cazimir, and George Topîrceanu.

Communist Era

Marin Preda is often considered the most important post-World War II Romanian novelist. His novel, Moromeții ("The Moromete Family"),  describes the life and difficulties of an ordinary peasant family in pre-war Romania and later during the advent of Communism in Romania. His most important book remains Cel mai iubit dintre pământeni ("The Most Beloved of Earthlings"), a cruel description of communist society. Zaharia Stancu published his first important novel, Desculț (Barefoot), in 1948.

Some of the most important poets are Nichita Stănescu, Marin Sorescu, Ana Blandiana, Leonid Dimov, and Ștefan Augustin Doinaș. An important novelist of this era was Radu Tudoran.

Outside Romania, Eugène Ionesco and Emil Cioran represented the national spirit at the highest level. Ionesco is one of the foremost playwrights of the Theatre of the Absurd; beyond ridiculing the most banal situations, Ionesco's plays depict in a tangible way the solitude of humans and the insignificance of one's existence. Cioran was a writer and philosopher.

Contemporary literature

Some Romanian contemporary writers:

 Gabriela Adameșteanu
 
 Radu Aldulescu
 Nicolae Breban 
 
 Mircea Cărtărescu
 Traian T. Coșovei
 Gheorghe Crăciun
 
 Radu Pavel Gheo
 
 
 Claudiu Komartin
 
 Norman Manea
 
 
 Herta Müller (2009 Nobel Laureate)
 
 Mircea Nedelciu
 Ioana Pârvulescu
 Dora Pavel
 Dumitru Radu Popescu
 
 
 Doina Ruști
 
 
 
 
 Bogdan Suceavă
 
 Dumitru Țepeneag

Chronology: 19th century-present day

1812	Țiganiada				Ioan Budai-Deleanu			(epic poem)
1847     Povestea vorbii        Anton Pann          (narrative poem)
1850     Cântarea României                           Alecu Russo               (epic poetry)
1857     Alexandru Lăpușneanul     Costache Negruzzi       (historical novel)
1861-1863, posthoumously  Românii supt Mihai-Voievod Viteazul      Nicolae Bălcescu    (historical non-fiction)
1867  Răzvan și Vidra  Bogdan Petriceicu Hasdeu   (play)
1879  Amintiri din copilărie Ion Creangă  (autobiographical novel)
1883 Poezii Mihai Eminescu			(poetry) 
1884     O Scrisoare Pierdută                     I.L. Caragiale			(play)
1894  Mara  Ioan Slavici  (novel)
1920 Ion Liviu Rebreanu (novel)
1924	În Marea Trecere				Lucian Blaga		(poetry)
1925     Danton         Camil Petrescu               (play)
1927	Concert din Muzică de Bach			Hortensia Papadat-Bengescu			(novel)
1927	Cuvinte Potrivite			Tudor Arghezi		(poetry)
1929	Craii de Curtea-Veche				Mateiu Caragiale		(novel)
1930     Joc Secund         Ion Barbu               (poetry)
1933	Patul lui Procust			Camil Petrescu		(novel)
1934	Ioana			Anton Holban		(novel)
1936	Întâmplări în Irealitate Imediată		Max Blecher		(novel)
1938	Enigma Otiliei			George Călinescu		(novel)
1943 Panopticum Ion Caraion (poetry)
1945	Plantații			Constant Tonegaru		(poetry)
1946	Stanțe Burgheze			George Bacovia 			(poetry)
1946	Libertatea de a Trage cu Pușca			Geo Dumitrescu			(poetry)
1947	Don Juana			Radu Stanca		(play)
1955 Moromeții Marin Preda (novel)
1956	Primele Iubiri			Nicolae Labiș		(poetry)
1964	Ultimele sonete închipuite ale lui Shakespeare			Vasile Voiculescu 			(poetry)
1965   Iarna Bărbaților  (short prose)
1966	Omul cu Compasul			Ștefan Augustin Doinaș 			(poetry)
1966	11 Elegii			Nichita Stănescu		(poetry)
1968     Iona    Marin Sorescu   (play)
1969	Carte de Vise			Leonid Dimov		(poetry)
1969	Dicționar onomastic					(novel)
1970 Matei Iliescu  (novel)
1973	Vânătoarea Regală			Dumitru Radu Popescu		(novel)
1975	Lumea în Două Zile			George Bălăiță		(novel)
1977	Cartea de la Metropolis						(novel)
1977	Bunavestire			Nicolae Breban		(novel)
1980	Faruri, Vitrine, Fotografii			Mircea Cărtărescu			(poetry)
1983	Dimineață Pierdută	Gabriela Adameșteanu			(novel)
1983	Poeme de Amor	Mircea Cărtărescu			(poetry)
1988	versuri vechi, nouă		Mircea Ivănescu		(poetry)
1989	Și Ieri Va Fi o Zi			Mircea Nedelciu			(short prose)
1990	Levantul			Mircea Cărtărescu		(epic poem)
1993	Nostalgia			Mircea Cărtărescu			(short prose)
1996	Amantul Colivaresei			Radu Aldulescu		(novel)
1996	Coaja lucrurilor, sau Dansând cu Jupuita			Adrian Oțoiu		(novel)
1996	Orbitor. Aripa stângă			Mircea Cărtărescu		(novel)
2004     Omulețul roșu       Doina Ruști   (novel)
2004	Pupa Russa				Gheorghe Crăciun			(novel)
2004	Proorocii Ierusalimului				Radu Aldulescu		(novel)
2006     Zogru       Doina Ruști   (novel)
2008     Fantoma din moară       Doina Ruști   (novel)
2009     Lizoanca la 11 ani       Doina Ruști   (novel)
2015     Manuscrisul fanariot       Doina Ruști   (novel)
2017     Mâța Vinerii/The Book of Perilous Dishes       Doina Ruști   (novel)
2010     Rădăcina de bucsau         (novel)
2018     Armaghedon revelat        (novel)

Translations of Romanian literature
 "Testament - Anthology of Modern Romanian Verse - Bilingual Edition - English/Romanian" (Daniel Ioniță, with Eva Foster and Daniel Reynaud; Editura Minerva 2012 - ). This presents a comprehensive selection of Romanian poetry from 1850 to the present (post 2010) covering 56 poets and over 75 poems. It includes classics such as Vasile Alecsandri, Mihai Eminescu, Ion Minulescu, George Coșbuc, Tudor Arghezi, Vasile Voiculescu, Nicolae Labiș, as well as contemporaries such as Nichita Stănescu, Ana Blandiana, Marin Sorescu, Nora Iuga, Cezar Ivănescu, Ileana Mălăncioiu, Adrian Păunescu, George Tarnea, Mircea Cărtărescu, Daniel Banulescu, Lucian Vasilescu, Adrian Munteanu, Liliana Ursu, Doina Uricariu, and others. The volume is prefaced by literary critic and historian Alex Ștefănescu.
 " The Disheveled Maidens" (Hortensia Papadat-Bengescu, Romanian Cultural Institute Publishing House 2004)
 "Something is still present and isn't, of what's gone. - A Bilingual Anthology of Avant-Garde and Avant-Garde Inspired Rumanian poetry - English/Rumanian" (Victor Pambuccian; Aracne editrice, Rome 2018 - ). It includes poems of Tristan Tzara, B. Fundoianu, Ilarie Voronca, Geo Bogza, Max Blecher, Gherasim Luca, Gellu Naum, Geo Dumitrescu, Paul Celan, Ion Caraion, Nora Iuga, Nichita Stănescu, George Almosnino, Constantin Abăluță, Vintilă Ivănceanu, Daniel Turcea, Mariana Marin. The volume is prefaced by literary critic and historian of the Romanian avant-garde Mădălina Lascu.

See also
List of Romanian novelists
List of Romanian writers

References 

 George Călinescu, Istoria literaturii române de la origini până în prezent ("The History of the Romanian Literature from its origins until present day"), 1941
 Nicolae Iorga, Istoria literaturii românești ("The History of the Romanian Literature"), 1929
 Alex Ștefănescu, Istoria literaturii române contemporane, 1941-2000 ("The History of the Contemporary Romanian Literature, 1941-2000"), 2005
 Dan C Mihăilescu, Literatura română în postceaușism, Vol II, Proza. Prezentul ca dezumanizare, Editura Polirom, 2006 Vol II, Proza. Prezentul ca dezumanizare, Ed. Polirom, 2006

External links 

Romanian poetry
Romanian literature
Website of the Romanian Museum of Literature
Lingua Romana, a journal on Romanian literature
Beyond the Iron Curtain: Revisiting the Literary System of Communist Romania (Introduction)